Salif Sané (born 25 August 1990) is a professional footballer who plays as a defender for the Senegal national team.

Born in France, he represents Senegal at international level.

Early and personal life
Sané was born in Lormont, France to Senegalese parents. His older half brother is fellow footballer Lamine Sané.

Club career
Born in Lormont, Sané spent his early career playing club football in France for Bordeaux, Nancy and Nancy II. In June 2012 Sané rejected an offer from Belgian club Anderlecht. In May 2013 it was announced that he would transfer to German club Hannover 96 on 1 July 2013, signing a four-year contract with the club.

On 11 April 2018, Sané announced that he would be leaving Hannover 96 at the end of the season. It was announced that he would sign for Schalke 04 for the 2018–19 season. 

Sane was signed to become a key player for Schalke. His strength, athleticism and tackling ability has made many believe he has the potential to become one of the best defensive players in the Bundesliga. Sane's flexibility as a player has allowed him to play both in defence and in midfield. When he has played in defence, he has contested and won more aerial duels than any other player in the Bundesliga.

International career
In September 2012, Sané announced his intention to play international football for Senegal. He received his first international call up from Senegal in May 2013. He made his international debut later that year, and he has played in FIFA World Cup qualifying matches. In December 2014 he was named as part of Senegal's preliminary squad for the 2015 Africa Cup of Nations.

In May 2018 he was named in Senegal’s 23 man squad for the 2018 World Cup in Russia.

Career statistics

Club

International

Honours
Senegal
Africa Cup of Nations runner-up: 2019

Schalke 04
2. Bundesliga: 2021–22

References

1990 births
Living people
Sportspeople from Gironde
Association football defenders
Senegalese footballers
Senegal international footballers
French footballers
French sportspeople of Senegalese descent
Senegalese expatriate footballers
FC Girondins de Bordeaux players
AS Nancy Lorraine players
Hannover 96 players
Hannover 96 II players
FC Schalke 04 players
Ligue 1 players
Bundesliga players
2. Bundesliga players
Regionalliga players
Expatriate footballers in Germany
2015 Africa Cup of Nations players
2018 FIFA World Cup players
2019 Africa Cup of Nations players
Footballers from Nouvelle-Aquitaine